The Five Pound Man is a 1937 British comedy crime film directed by Albert Parker and starring Judy Gunn, Edwin Styles and Charles Bannister. It was made at Wembley Studios as a quota quickie by the British subsidiary of 20th Century Fox.

Cast
 Judy Gunn as  Margaret Fenton
 Edwin Styles as Richard Fordyce
 Frank Allenby as Claud Fenton
 Charles Bannister as Eustace Grant
 Esma Cannon as Lucy
 G. H. Mulcaster as Sinclair

References

Bibliography
 Chibnall, Steve. Quota Quickies: The Birth of the British 'B' Film. British Film Institute, 2007.
 Low, Rachael. Filmmaking in 1930s Britain. George Allen & Unwin, 1985.
 Wood, Linda. British Films, 1927-1939. British Film Institute, 1986.

External links

1937 films
1930s crime comedy films
British crime comedy films
Films directed by Albert Parker
British black-and-white films
1937 comedy films
1930s English-language films
1930s British films
Quota quickies
Films shot at Wembley Studios
20th Century Fox films